The Mexico City Metrobús Line 6 is a bus rapid transit line in the Mexico City Metrobus. It operates between El Rosario in the municipality of Azcapotzalco, in northern Mexico City, and Villa de Aragón in Gustavo A. Madero, in the eastern limits of the city with the municipality of Ecatepec de Morelos in the State of Mexico, Mexico.

Construction of Line 6 started on August 6, 2014 and it was inaugurated on January 21, 2016 by Miguel Ángel Mancera, Head of Government of the Federal District from 2012 to 2018.

Service description

Services
The line has three itineraries:

Villa de Aragón to El Rosario
To El Rosario
First Bus: 4:20 (Monday-Friday)
Last Bus: 00:18 (Monday-Friday)
First Bus: 4:30 (Saturday)
Last Bus: 00:20 (Saturday)
First Bus: 5:00 (Sunday)
Last Bus: 00:18 (Sunday)

To Villa de Aragón
First Bus: 4:22 (Monday-Friday)
Last Bus: 00:17 (Monday-Friday)
First Bus: 4:21 (Saturday)
Last Bus: 00:13 (Saturday)
First Bus: 5:00 (Sunday)
Last Bus: 00:17 (Sunday)

Villa de Aragón to Instituto Politécnico Nacional
From Villa de Aragón
First Bus: 4:30 (Monday-Friday)
Last Bus: 22:00 (Monday-Friday)
First Bus: 4:45 (Saturday)
Last Bus: 22:16 (Saturday)
No service on Sunday

To Villa de Aragón
First Bus: 4:37 (Monday-Friday)
Last Bus: 22:40 (Monday-Friday)
First Bus: 4:55 (Saturday)
Last Bus: 22:26 (Saturday)
No service on Sunday

Deportivo 18 de Marzo to El Rosario
To El Rosario
First Bus: 4:30 (Monday-Friday)
Last Bus: 22:15 (Monday-Friday)
No service on Saturday and Sunday

From El Rosario
First Bus: 4:24 (Monday-Friday)
Last Bus: 23:36 (Monday-Friday)
No service on Saturday and Sunday

Line 6 services the Azcapotzalco and Gustavo A. Madero municipalities.

Station list

{| class="wikitable"
|-
! width="160px" | Stations
! Connections
! Neighborhood(s) 
! width="100px" | Borough
! Picture
! Date opened
|-
|  El Rosario
| 
 El Rosario
  Line 6: El Rosario station
  Line 7: El Rosario station
 Routes: 19, 19-A, 59, 59-A, 107
 Lines 4 and 6: El Rosario stop
| rowspan=2| Unidad Habitacional El Rosario
| rowspan=8| Azcapotzalco
| 
| rowspan=37| January 21, 2016
|-
|  Colegio de Bachilleres 1
|
 Routes: 19, 19-A, 59, 59-A, 107
 Line 6: Bachilleres 1 stop
|-
|  De las Culturas
| 
 Routes: 19, 19-A, 107
| Unidad Habitacional El Rosario, San Martín Xochinahuac
|-
|  Ferrocarriles Nacionales
|
 Routes: 19, 19-A
|  San Martín Xochinahuac
|-
|  UAM Azcapotzalco
| 
 Routes: 19, 19-A, 107, 107-B
| San Martín Xochinahuac, Santa Bárbara
|-
|  Tecnoparque
| 
 Routes: 19, 19-A, 107-B
| Santa Bárbara
|-
|  Norte 59
| 
| rowspan=2| Industrial Vallejo
|-
|  Norte 45
| 
  Line 6: Norte 45 station (at distance)
 Route: 15-A (at distance)
| 
|-
|  Montevideo
| 
  Line 3: Montevideo
| Industrial Vallejo, Nueva Vallejo
| Azcapotzalco, Gustavo A. Madero
| 
|-
|  Lindavista-Vallejo
|
| Nueva Vallejo, Lindavista Vallejo
| rowspan=28| Gustavo A. Madero
|-
|  Instituto del Petróleo
| 
  Line 5: Instituto del Petróleo station (at distance)
  Line 6: Instituto del Petróleo station (at distance)
 Routes: 23, 27-A, 103
 Line 1: Instituto del Petróleo stop (north–south route; at distance)
 Line 8: Montevideo stop (at distance)
| Lindavista Vallejo, San Bartolo Atepehuacán
|- 
|  San Bartolo
|
| San Bartolo Atepehuacán, Lindavista Sur
| 
|-
|  Instituto Politécnico Nacional
| 
 Routes: 25, 104
| rowspan=2| Lindavista Sur
|-
|  Riobamba
| 
| 
|-
|  Deportivo 18 de Marzo
| 
  Line 1: Deportivo 18 de Marzo station
 Deportivo 18 de Marzo
  Line 3: Deportivo 18 de Marzo station
  Line 6: Deportivo 18 de Marzo station
 Route: 15-B
| rowspan=2| Tepeyac Insurgentes
| 
|-
|  La Villa
| 
  Line 6: La Villa-Basílica station (at distance)
  Line 7: Garrido station (at distance)
 Routes: 25, 101-A, 101-B, 101-D, 107-B
 Line 5: Garrido stop (at distance)
 Route: 15-B (at distance)
| 
|-
|  De los Misterios
| 
  Line 7: De los Misterios station
 Routes: 101-A, 101-B, 101-D, 107-B
 Line 5: Av. Montevideo stop
| Tepeyac Insurgentes, Villa Gustavo A. Madero
| 
|-
|  Hospital Infantil La Villa
| 
  Line 7: Hospital Infantil La Villa station
 Routes: 101-A, 101-B, 101-D, 107-B
<li> Line 5: Hospital de la Villa stop
| Villa Gustavo A. Madero, Estanzuela
| 
|-
|  Delegación Gustavo A. Madero
| 
<li>  Line 7: Delegación Gustavo A. Madero station
<li> Route: 107-B
<li> Line 5: Cuauhtémoc stop
| Villa Gustavo A. Madero, Martín Carrera
| 
|-
|  Martín Carrera
| 
<li> Martín Carrera
<li>  Line 4: Martín Carrera station
<li>  Line 6: Martín Carrera station
<li> Routes: 33, 37
<li> Line 5: Martín Carrera stop
<li> Route: 5-A
| rowspan=2| Constitución de la República, Granjas Modernas
| 
|-
|  Hospital General La Villa
| 
| 
|-
|  San Juan de Aragón
| 
<li>  Line 5: San Juan de Aragón station
<li> Line 5: Gran Canal stop
| Constitución de la República, Granjas Modernas, DM Nacional
| 
|-
|  Gran Canal
| 
| DM Nacional, Amp. Casas Alemán
| 
|-
|  Casas Alemán
|
| Ampliación Casas Alemán, Héroes de Chapultepec
|-
|  Pueblo San Juan de Aragón
|
| Pueblo San Juan de Aragón
|-
|  Loreto Fabela
|
<li> Routes: 15-B, 15-C
| Pueblo San Juan de Aragón, San Juan de Aragón
|-
|  482
|
<li> Route: 15-C
| rowspan=3| San Juan de Aragón
|-
|  414
|
|-
|  416 Oriente
|
|-
|  416 Poniente
|
<li> Route: 43
<li> Route: 15-B
| rowspan=2| Ampliación Casas Alemán, San Juan de Aragón
|-
|  Deportivo Los Galeana
|
<li> Route: 43
<li> Route: 15-B
|-
|  Ampliación Providencia
| 
| Providencia, San Juan de Aragón
|-
|  Volcán de Fuego
|
| Ampliación Providencia, San Juan de Aragón
| 
|-
|  La Pradera
|
| rowspan=2| La Pradera, San Juan de Aragón
|-
|  Colegio de Bachilleres 9
|
|-
|  Francisco Morazán
|
| rowspan=2| Villa de Aragón, San Juan de Aragón
|-
|  Villa de Aragón
|
<li>  Line B: Villa de Aragón station
<li> Routes: 15-A, 15-C
| 
|}

Operators
Corredor Antenas-Rosario, SA de CV (CARSA) is the sole operator of Line 6.

Notes

References

2016 establishments in Mexico
6
Bus rapid transit in Mexico